Patrick McGowan (16 July 1926 – 3 October 1999) was a Fianna Fáil politician in Ireland.

A farmer and potato merchant, he was an elected to Seanad Éireann from 1965 to 1981, and from 1987 to 1999. He was elected on the Agricultural Panel and served for 28 years making him one of Ireland's longest serving Seanad Éireann members.

In 1970 he agreed to pay £3,900 including costs to a Donegal Businessman, Daniel Brolly, in a High Court case after he was accused of Adultery.

His son Patrick is a member of Donegal County Council for the Stranorlar electoral area, and was an unsuccessful candidate in the 2002 and 2007 Seanad elections, on the Agricultural Panel.

References

1926 births
1999 deaths
Local councillors in County Donegal
Fianna Fáil senators
Members of the 11th Seanad
Members of the 12th Seanad
Members of the 13th Seanad
Members of the 14th Seanad
Members of the 18th Seanad
Members of the 19th Seanad
Members of the 20th Seanad
Members of the 21st Seanad
Irish farmers